Wolfram Kühn (born 7 November 1952) is a retired German Navy Vizeadmiral. He served as Deputy Inspector General of the Bundeswehr and Inspector of the Joint Support Service from 2006 to his retirement in 2012.

Military career 
Kühn entered the Bundeswehr in 1972. After basic naval officer training, he studied Economics and Business Administration at the Bundeswehr University of Munich. After graduating in 1977 he served on the Destroyer Schleswig-Holstein as a CIC officer. In 1979 he was promoted to Kapitänleutnant (captain lieutenant) and assigned to the Territorial Command of Schleswig-Holstein as Adjutant of the commander, who was also the highest German responsible within NATO's Allied Forces Northern Europe (AFNORTH). From 1982 to 1984 Kühn served as department head of the supply department on Frigate Rheinland-Pfalz. Selected for the Admiral Staff Officer Course at the Führungsakademie der Bundeswehr it was during this course that he was promoted to Korvettenkapitän (corvette captain).

From 1986 to 1987 Kühn served as an instructor and company commander at the Navy Supply School in List (Sylt). From 1988 to 1989 he again was posted at the Territorial Command of Schleswig-Holstein, this time as a logistics staff officer (G4). Later he served at the Ministry of Defense in Bonn until 1991. From 1991 until 1993 Kühn was assigned to the Navy Supply School as Division Commander and Vice Commander of the school. During the next two years he again served at the Ministry of Defense within the Navy Staff and was responsible for general issues, logistics and procurement. In 1994 he studied at the Defence Resources Management Institute (DRMI) of the Naval Postgraduate School in Monterey, California.

Back in Germany from 1994 to 1997 he served as Chief Financial Officer in the Navy Support Command in Wilhelmshaven. From 1997 to 1998 he studied at the National War College in Washington, D.C. and gained a Master of Science in National Security Strategy. From 1998 to 2001 he was assigned to the Federal Ministry of Defence as a section chief. From 2001 to 2002 Kühn served as Chief of Staff of the Joint Support Command. From 2002 to 2002 he was Staff Department Chief in the Navy Staff. In 2004 he was Chief of Staff of the Inspector General of the Bundeswehr. In 2006 he was promoted to Vizeadmiral (vice admiral) and appointed Inspector of the Joint Support Service and Deputy Inspector General of the Bundeswehr. On 28 March 2012, Kühn handed over his post to Manfred Nielson, his retirement from military service marked by a Großer Zapfenstreich.

References 

Vice admirals of the German Navy
Living people
1952 births
Recipients of the Cross of the Order of Merit of the Federal Republic of Germany
Bundeswehr University Munich alumni